Imagine Edgenuity, formerly Education2020 (E2020), is a standard-based online learning resource for school districts produced by Imagine Learning, which teaches kindergarten through 12th-grade in core, elective, credit recovery, technical, and career subjects, through both remedial and accelerated work.  As of 2019, Imagine Edgenuity serves more than four million students in the United States.

History

Origins and lobbying convictions (1988 – 2016) 
Edgenuity was founded in 1988 as Education2020 Inc. (E2020), and in 2011, was purchased by the company Weld North for an estimated US$50 million dollars. In 2014, Edgenuity launched My Path, a program learning path alternative for reading and math grades 6-12th. The same year, Edgenuity partnered with SOPHIA Learning to offer additional credit options.

Edgenuity began seeing an increase in usage in the 2010s; from 2012 to 2014, Edgenuity paid politician Mike Hubbard in an act of lobbying a total of US$210,000 dollars including a series of weekly checks worth US$7500 each titled "lobbying services". According to Edgenuity executive vice president Michael Humphrey, testifying in court, the act was done "to open doors"; he intended to use Hubbard as a way to secure and engage future meetings with higher Legislative members. Hubbard was convicted to four years in prison for ethical violations according to state laws. State School board member Mary Scott Hunter emailed superintendent Dr. Tommy Bice about the matter in March 2015, only for him to never respond and retire less than a month later.

COVID-19 pandemic and spike in popularity (2019—present)

Edgenuity became a popular tool for remote learning during the COVID-19 pandemic. Due to stay-at-home orders and schools needing an alternative teaching source, Edgenuity saw a massive spike in usage, resulting in slow servers and site crashing; many schools reported problems with the site in its early stages of the pandemic.  The amount of new users caused a lack of course instructor employees, but was later resolved. According to school districts, Edgenuity was a popular choice mainly due to a lack of other options.

By 2021, the COVID-19 pandemic resulted in the admission of 500 school districts to the service, earning the company US$145 million dollars in profit—double what the company made the year prior—due to the spike of Edgenuity usage alongside other learning platforms acquired by the company before the pandemic began.

Education style 

Imagine Edgenuity is a virtual alternative, and uses pre-recorded videos and primarily focuses on struggling students, and sticking at pace. Along with pre-recorded lecture, Imagine Edgenuity uses interactives and real-world problems. In addition to helping students who need extra support, the software is often used by schools to help students who have failed courses get the credits they are missing.

Awards and nominations 
In 2020, Digital Promise awarded Imagine Edgenuity's Courseware, Mypath, and Pathblazer services with the Research-Based Design Product Certification.

Reception 
During the time of the site's popularity during the pandemic, both parents and students complained how Edgenuity was frustrating, stating difficulties in loading, understanding concepts, and the inability to skip newly presented content. Most of the pass/fail content comes from quizzes at the end of each lesson, and parents noted how students were memorizing the answers to reappearing questions rather than learning the material. Parents have also cited the function of tutoring help, where students can get aid from a real teacher when they get stuck on a question. Some students complained over long waiting times, some waiting hours, for the arrival of virtual tutor aid. According to Angie Richardson, a parent of a 13-year-old student interviewed by Buzzfeed Newss Erik Carter, both virtual tutoring and emails were often slow and sometimes entirely unresponsive, and her child was ultimately required to return to brick and mortar due to falling behind. 

Edgenuity has been criticized for the standardization of their test questions, the nature of the standardization causes students who failed a test to receive a very similar set of questions the second attempt, making it easy to guess answers via trial and error. A study published by Slate Magazine showed that students using Edgenuity received on average 37 out of 50 identical questions during their second attempt to pass a test. Another study from The Verge discovered short answer questions are graded through artificial intelligence, and students have found ways to cheat using keywords the AI is looking for to give passing grades. The Verge cited a teacher whose student was using the site, who inserted words in an order that was patent nonsense yet included words that were involved in answering the question, dubbed a "word salad", and received full credit for the response.

Teachers also showed frustration with how Edgenuity handles student organization in their contracts. In Providence, Rhode Island, teachers were given an average of 52 students to handle each and weren't able to properly communicate with all of them in an orderly manner. In St. Tammany Parish, Louisiana, some teachers were even given up to 600 students to manage via email each.

In 2021, CEO Sari Factor released a statement addressing the issues arisen by the public. She stated how some districts were using the site in unintended ways, and schools that were following procedure were benefiting off the program. She also mentioned how the students to teacher ration was off-balance due to the school having a lack of employment, and also blamed student struggles on the effects of COVID-19 on the system and education.

References 

Classroom management software
American companies established in 1998